Amazon Sidewalk is a low-bandwidth long-range wireless communication protocol developed by Amazon. It uses Bluetooth Low Energy (BLE) for short distance communication, and 900 MHz LoRa and other frequencies for longer distances.

History 
In September, 2019, Amazon announced the Amazon Sidewalk network and a domestic pet collar called Fetch (developed together with Tile) as the first device which would use the network. The network is composed of existing customers' Echo smart speakers which act as the bridges between Sidewalk and the Internet.

In September 2020, Amazon started seeking hardware developers to partner and develop devices for the network.

In May 2021, Amazon and Tile announced plans to use Sidewalk to compete with the AirTag tracker device and associated location service from Apple.

Amazon launched the network in the US on June 8, 2021.

Reception 
Amazon Echo devices have Sidewalk enabled by default and do not inform their owner about it. The feature can be disabled via the official app.

A number of prominent news publishers, including The Guardian, ArsTechnica, CNET, PCMag, Click2Houston, and Bleeping Computer, expressed concern with opt-out nature of the network and published guides how to disable Amazon Sidewalk.

Amazon stated that "the maximum bandwidth of a Sidewalk Bridge to the Sidewalk server is 80Kbps, which is about 1/40th [2.5%] of the bandwidth used to stream a typical high definition video." This comparison is misleading for ADSL connections with upstream bandwidth more limited than downstream bandwidth: 80Kbps approaches 20% of the capacity of a 448Kbps uplink.

Technology 
Amazon Sidewalk amalgamates multiple physical-layer wireless networking protocols and presents them into a single application layer they call "Sidewalk Application Layer".

Transmission technologies:

 Bluetooth Low Energy for short distances and battery efficiency
 LoRa for long-range low-power communication
 Frequency-shift keying at 900 MHz, intended for interacting with legacy home appliances like garage door openers

Devices 
The following devices support Amazon Sidewalk:

 Amazon Echo devices
 Ring doorbells and cameras
 Fetch, an upcoming pet collar from Tile

See also 
 LoRa
 Zigbee
 Weightless (wireless communications)

External links 

 Amazon Sidewalk Privacy and Security Whitepaper FAQ

References 

Wireless
Mesh networking
Networking standards
Amazon (company)